Belomorkanal is a Russian brand of cigarettes, originally made by the Uritsky tobacco factory in Leningrad, Soviet Union.

History

Belomorkanal was introduced in 1932 to commemorate the construction of the White Sea–Baltic Canal, also known as the Belomorkanal. Process engineer  was the creator of its tobacco blend, and the pack drawing was made by Andrey Tarakanov.

Belomorkanal is a cigarette of specific design called in Russian papirosa (папироса), different from usual cigarettes. Generally, the cigarette is without a filter. Belomorkanal is an example of one of the stages in the evolution of cigarettes: it is composed of a hollow cardboard tube extended by a thin cigarette paper tube with tobacco. The cardboard tube plays the role of a disposable cigarette holder. This method was abandoned by Western brands shortly after World War II. While smoking, the hollow part of the tube is usually compressed to make two separate perpendicular flat surfaces, for the sake of convenience. Belomorkanal are still produced in various post-Soviet republics, most notably in Russia, in Kamianets-Podilskyi (Ukraine), and in Hrodna (Belarus).

Belomorkanal is also used by cannabis users, wherein "emptied cigarettes are then filled with a mixture of tobacco and marijuana for smoking, with the cardboard tube serving as a built-in roach.

Markets
Belomorkanal cigarettes were widely available in the Soviet Union, they are still sold in some post-Soviet states, including Russia, Belarus and Ukraine.

In popular culture
In a 1985 song by Jan Krzysztof Kelus, the name of the cigarettes is compared to Auschwitz Filters due to the fact that many thousands of Gulag prisoners had died during the construction of the canal.

Nicolas Rothwell's 2013 novel Belomor takes its name from this cigarette.

In Simon Sebag Montefiore's WW2-set novel Red Sky at Noon (2017), it is stated that Belomorkanals were reserved for officers.

See also
 Tobacco smoking

References

External links
Belomorkanal Cigarettes
History of Belomorkanal 

Products introduced in 1932
Russian cigarette brands
Soviet brands